Vertical de Aviación is a charter airline based at El Dorado International Airport in Bogotá, Colombia. As the name implies, it flies mainly Helicopters, but the company also operates fixed wing aircraft such as the Jetstream32.

Although the company transports passengers and cargo, it has a much broader business model and scope focusing on Defense, Oil, Logistics and Government sectors.  As of 2017, it operates in Colombia, Peru, Ecuador, Brazil, Nigeria, Mexico, and Bolivia and has operated in Afghanistan through U.S. Transportation Command Directorate of Acquisition contracts.

History

Vertical de Aviación was founded in 1982, operating Bell helicopters.  It was the first Colombian airline to operate Russian helicopters transporting passengers and cargo.

Fleet

As of 2017, the company's fleet is composed of the following:

12 MI-171
4 Mil Mi-8 MI-171A1
4 MI-8 MTV
2 Sikorsky S-76d

Fixed wing
4 BAe Jetstream J-32 (turboprop aircraft)

References

External links
 Vertical de Aviacion Official page

Airlines of Colombia
Airlines established in 1982
Helicopter airlines
Colombian companies established in 1982